Federico I may refer to:

 Frederick I of Saluzzo (1287–1336)
 Federico I Gonzaga (1441–1484)